The Idlers of the Fertile Valley is a Greek film directed by Nikos Panayotopoulos. It won the Golden Leopard at the 1978 Locarno International Film Festival.

Cast
Vasilis Diamantopoulos as father
Olga Karlatos
Dimitris Poulikakos
Nikitas Tsakiroglou
Giorgos Dialegmenos

Reception
It won  the Golden Leopard at the 1978 Locarno International Film Festival.
Two awards for Best Editing and Best Production Design in Thessaloniki Film Festival

References

External links

Golden Leopard winners
Greek romantic comedy-drama films
1978 films